Chintpurni is a small town in the Una district of Himachal Pradesh about 40 km (25 miles) north of Una, not far from the border with the Indian state of Punjab. The elevation is about 977 meters (about 3,200 feet). It is home to the Maa Chintpurni Temple which is a major pilgrimage site as one of the Shakti Peethas in India. The Hindu genealogy registers at Chintpurni, Himachal Pradesh are kept here. 
North of Chintpurni are the western Himalayas. Chintpurni lies within the much lower Shiwalik (or Shivalik) range. 
 
The temple houses the Chintpurni shakti peeth (Chhinnamastika shakti peeth).

The legend behind the Shakti Peetha is part of the Shaktism tradition which tells the story of the self-immolation of the goddess Sati. Vishnu had to cut her body into 51 body parts, which fell on Earth and became sacred sites.

The legend of Chhinnamasta Devi is apparently also part of the Shaktism tradition in Chintpurni. Here, Chhinnamasta is interpreted as the severed-headed one as well as the foreheaded-one.

Ancient origin 
When Lord Vishnu severed the burning body of Maa Sati into 51 pieces so that Lord Shiva would calm down and stop his Tandava, the pieces were scattered over various places in the Indian subcontinent. It is believed that Sati's head fell at this place and is thus considered one of the most important of the 51 Shakti Peethas.

The goddess residing in Chintpurni is also known by the name of Chhinnamastika. According to Markandeya Purana, goddess Chandi defeated the demons after a fierce battle but two of her yogini emanations (Jaya and Vijaya) were still thirsty for more blood. Goddess Chandi cut off her own head to quench Jaya and Vijaya's thirst for more blood.

She is usually shown holding her own severed head in her hand, drinking one stream of blood spurting from the arteries in her neck, while at her side are two naked yoginis, each of whom drinks another stream of blood.

Chhinnamasta, the headless goddess, is the Great Cosmic Power who helps the sincere and devoted yogi to dissolve his or her mind, including all the preconceived ideas, attachments and habits into the Pure Divine Consciousness. Cutting off the head suggests the separation of the mind from the body, that is the freedom of the consciousness from the material confines of the physical body.

According to Puranic traditions, Chhinnamastika Devi will be protected by Shiva – Rudra Mahadev in the four directions. There are four Shiva temples – Kaleshwar Mahadev in the east, Narayhana Mahadev in the west, Muchkund Mahadev in the north and Shiva Bari in the south – which are nearly equidistant from Chintpurni. This also confirms Chintpurni as the abode of Chhinnamastika Devi.

Chintpurni temple as a Shakti Peeth 

The Chinnamastika Devi is a divine embodiment of self-sacrifice and there by the Chintpurni shri is considered as a Shakti Peetha. The story of Daksha yaga and Sati's self immolation is the story liked to the Shakti Peethas. Shakti Peethas are holy shrines of Shakti associated with a story that says about the falling of body parts of the corpse of Sati Devi, when Lord Shiva carried it and wandered in sorrow. There are 51 Shakti Peeth associated with the 51 alphabets in Sanskrit. It is believed that Sati Devi's feet fell here in this place

About the temple 
The temple dedicated to Mata Chintpurni Devi is located in Chintpurni village, Amb Tehsil of  District Una ; Himachal Pradesh. 
Devotees have been visiting this Shaktipeeth for centuries to pray at the lotus feet of Mata Shri Chhinnamastika Devi

They bring with them their worldly concerns and seek blessings from the Devi.

It is believed that if one asks something from the Devi with an honest heart, the wish is granted.

Apart from the holy shrine, some very picturesque places for sightseeing, indoor and outdoor activities are situated in and around Chintpurni.

Chintpurni is very well connected through roads. One can come here for a religious visit, on a holiday or for both. People enjoy the time here and return with everlasting memories.

History 
Pandit Mai Das, a Brahmin from Patiala Riyasat, is generally believed to have established this shrine of Mata Chintpurni Devi in Chhaproh village about 12 generations ago. Over time this place became known as Chintpurni after the eponymous deity. His descendants still live in Chintpurni and perform prayers and puja at the Chintpurni temple. These descendants are the official priests at the Temple.

Hindu genealogy records 
Hindu genealogy registers at Chintpurni are the genealogy registers of pilgrims maintained here by panditas. Hindu pilgrimage and marriage records were also used to be kept at this holy place. The Genealogical Society (GSU) of Utah, USA has microfilmed Hindu pilgrimage records for Haridwar and several other Hindu pilgrimage centres. Priests (pandits) located at each site would record the name, date, home-town and purpose of visit for each pilgrim. These records were grouped according to family and ancestral home. The holdings by GSU include Haridwar, Kurukshetra, Pehowa, Chintpurni, Jawalapur and Jawalamukhi.

Offering prayers 
Guidelines and Limited Opening Hours due to COVID-19 pandemic
Mata Shri Chintpurni Devi Temple is now open  9 am - 7 pm from 10 September 2020 onwards

Himachal Pradesh Government  has  given its approval to open religious places of worship for the public from September 10, 2020. The Department of Language, Art and Culture, Himachal Pradesh has issued the following guidelines to regulate the movement of pilgrims in the shrines.

Only 500 devotees per day will be allowed entry to the temple precincts. All devotees will be required to download the Arogya Setu app.

Out of state devotees should have a COVID-19 negative report and 2 day Chintpurni hotel booking.

All devotees should report at Chintpurni Sadan (near the New Bus Station) or Shambhu Barrier for registration and a health-related examination. Devotees with flu-like symptoms will be isolated in the hospital and tested for COVID-19. They will be allowed entry If their test report is negative.

Devotees above the age of 65, those with co-morbidities, expectant mothers and children below the age of 10 years would not be allowed entry,

Entry to the Temple Precinct will be via Gates 1 and 2 while maintaining social distancing. You may leave your shoes at the shoe storage facility at the Old Bus Adda. Devotees will be required to wash their hands and feet before they enter the Temple precinct. Arrangements have been made at Jagadamba Dhaba, near Mangat Ram's shop and the Old Bus Adda.

Only two priests will be allowed in the Garbha Griha. The priest should not touch or bless any person. No member of the public is allowed to enter the ‘garbh grih’. No physical offerings like prasad, distribution or sprinkling of holy water will be allowed inside the shrine.

.

Devotees usually bring offerings for the Devi. Sweets (e.g. suji halwa, laddoo, barfi), kheer (sugar-coated puffed rice), coconut (or other fruits), chunni, dhwaja (red-coloured flag), flowers and ghee are some of the offerings that devotees bring. One may bring the prasad from home or may buy it from one of the shops in the bazaars of Chintpurni.

In the center of the Temple is the temple garbha griha. The image of Mata Chintpurni Devi is installed here in the form of a pindi (a round stone). People queue up for a darshan of the Devi and make their prayers and offerings.

The view of the Chintpurni's villages and the far flung scenic contours is enjoyable from the back-yard of the temple.

Location and transportation  
Chintapurni Mata Mandir is situated 3 km West of Bharwain which lies on the Mubarkpur  - Dehra  - Kangra - Dharamsala Road.

Buses Facility

24 Hours Bus Service Provide to Passengers By Private Operators and H.R.T.C ( Government Buses ) .

Railway

Chintpurni Marg Railway Station is the Nearest Railway Station which is  20 km away from it

Private vehicles are usually not allowed beyond the ISBT  which is about 1.5 km from the Temple. Devotees need to walk this distance. About half of this distance is a gentle uphill incline and through a busy market.

The temple is open from 4 am to 11 pm.

Weather 
Spring : About mid-February to mid-April. It is still cold with pleasant days.

Summer : Mid-April to end of mid-July. It is hot in summer and light cottons are recommended.

Rainy season : Mid-July to September (monsoon time). Still quite warm and, of course, rainy and humid.

Autumn : October to November. Days are pleasant, nights are cool. Light woolens may be needed at night and morning.

Winter: December – January. It is cold and woolens are required. The winter nights are much colder and an extra layer of woolens are required.

In general, temperature in Chintpurni is about 5 degrees lower than in the Punjab and Haryana plains and in Delhi. The average annual rainfall is 2587 mm. In 2012, it had a chilling winter as there was a snowfall, reported after a period of 52 years, leading to road jams.

Accommodation 

The Navaratra fairs in Shrawan (July–August), Ashwin (September–October) and Chaitra (March–April) are popular with devotees when accommodation is very tight. Other popular days are Sankranti, Purnima and Ashtami. As per the Hindu Manayata  , disciple belief that on day of Ashtami on Shravan Navratri the nine jyot of other shakti peeth were come to visit in the temple .   

There are a number of dharamshalas, guest houses and hotels of varying quality in and around Chintpurni. Himachal Tourism runs Hotel Chintpurni Heights (formerly Yatri Niwas) at Bharwain, near Thaneek Pura which is only 3 km from the Chintpurni temple. It has views of the Swan valley to the south. At night to the west one can see the bright lights of the Temple and its bazaar. Looking towards the northwest are the shimmering waters of the Maharana Pratap Sagar (Pong Dam lake).

There are number of hotels and lodges to stay ranging from budget to luxury. On the way to Maa Chintpurni from Gagret hotels and picnic spots starts so there are plenty of options to stay and dine.

Getting there 
There are a number of ways to get to Chintpurni from Delhi and other places in north India.

By road:

From Delhi: Delhi – Chandigarh – Ropar – Nangal – Una – Amb- Mubarikpur – Thaneek Pura – Bharwain – Chintpurni

From Jalandhar: Jalandhar – Hoshiarpur – Gagret -Mubarikpur – Thaneek Pura – Bharwain – Chintpurni

By bus:

Delhi, Haryana, Punjab and Himachal State Transport departments run buses on the Delhi-Chandigarh-Chintpurni route. Himachal Road Transport Corporation runs a daily Volvo coach service between Delhi and Chintpurni. Buses running on the Delhi-Chandigarh-Dharamshala and Delhi-Chandigarh-Palampur route stop at either Bharwain or Chintpurni bus stand. Frequent State Transport bus services are also available from important cities of Punjab, Haryana, Jammu and Kashmir, Rajasthan, Uttarakhand, and Delhi, etc.

By train:

A number of trains can be used to travel to Chintpurni. Frequent bus and taxi services to Chintpurni are available from all nearby railway stations.
The nearest railway station is Chintpurni Marg (station code CHMG), which is about 17 km from the Chintpurni temple.
Other nearby stations are Una Himachal (station code UHL) at 50 km and Hoshiarpur (station code HSX) at 42 km.

The following trains are best suited:

 Himachal Express (14553): Daily, Delhi to Chintpurni Marg, Himachal Pradesh. Leaves Old Delhi railway station at 10.30 pm and reaches Chintpurni Marg station at 5.30 am.
 Jan Shatabadi (12057): Daily, Delhi to Una Himachal. Leaves New Delhi railway station at 3 pm and reaches Una at 10 pm.
 DMU Shuttle Train Service (74992): Daily, Ambala to Chintpurni Marg via Nangal Dam and Una.

By air:

Nearest airport is at Gaggal in Dharmshala, which is in Kangra district. Distance to Chintpurni is about 60 km. Air India and Spicejet provide daily services to dharmshala Airport. Other airports are at Amritsar (160 km) and Chandigarh (150 km).

Some distances 

 Delhi – Chandigarh – Ropar – Nangal – Una – Mubarakpur – Bharwain – Chintpurni : 420 km
 Chandigarh – Ropar – Nangal – Una – Mubarakpur – Bharwain – Chintpurni : 150 km
 Jalandhar – Hoshiarpur – Gagret – Bharwain – Chintpurni : 90 km
 Hoshiarpur – Gagret – Bharwain – Chintpurni : 42 km
 Kangra – Jwalaji – Bharwain – Chintpurni : 55 km
 Naina Devi – Nangal – Una – Mubarakpur – Bharwain – Chintpurni : 115 km
 Vaishno Devi – Jammu – Pathankot – Kangra – Bharwain – Chintpurni : 250 km

gallary

References

External links 

 JaiMaaChintpurni.com
 JaiMaaChintpurniJi.org
 Mata Chintpurni Devi - first website established in 2004
Mata chintpurni chalisa 
 Chintpurni
 Mata Shri Chintpurni Ji – Official website
 Mata Shri Chintpurni Ji complete info

Cities and towns in Una district
Tourism in Himachal Pradesh
Hindu temples in Himachal Pradesh
Buildings and structures in Una district